The State Register of Heritage Places is maintained by the Heritage Council of Western Australia. , 675 places are heritage-listed in the City of Swan, of which 317 are on the State Register of Heritage Places.

List
The Western Australian State Register of Heritage Places, lists the following 317 state registered places within the City of Swan:

Notes

 No coordinates specified by Inherit database

 † Denotes building has been demolished

References

Swan